Mount Ishigaki is a mountain located in Odawara, Kanagawa Prefecture. The altitude is 241 meters. It was designated as a national historic site in 1959.

References

See also 

 Ishigakiyama Ichiya Castle

Ishigaki
Odawara